Terry Taylor (born 1955) is an American retired wrestler

Terry Taylor may also refer to:
Terry Taylor (American football) (born 1961), former professional American football player
Terry Taylor (baseball) (born 1964), Major League Baseball pitcher for the Seattle Mariners in 1988
Terry Taylor (basketball) (born 1999), American college basketball player
Terry Taylor (musician) (born 1948), British rock musician
Terry Scott Taylor (born 1950), American songwriter
Terry Taylor (footballer) (born 2001), Scottish-born Welsh footballer

See also
Terrance Taylor (American football) (born 1986), American football defensive tackle